A.U (阿U or 阿优) is a Chinese media franchise comprising manhua, cartoons and games that was introduced in 2009. It is a brand owned by Hangzhou A.U Cultural Creativity Co., Ltd. It centers on a boy of the same name and his friends.

Characters
A.U (阿U) - A red-haired boy who is curious, naughty, and loving. 
Pangzi (胖仔) - A fat boy who loves to eat.
Amei (阿美) - A girl who is pretty and smart.
Nanrenpo (男人婆) - A tomboy who is straightforward.

Comics and animation
A.U comic books were first released by Zhejiang Juvenile and Children's Publishing House in 2011, and as of 2013 over 100 million copies were sold. The first A.U animated series premiered in China Central Television in August 2012 and A.U cartoons have since become popular. In 2014, the fifth season (阿U之神奇萝卜) introduced rabbit characters in the show.

Merchandising and games
There is an A.U clothing brand for children with the chief designer being Yves Castaldi,. Other branded products including snacks, footwear, and wallpaper became available. Electronic educational devices for young children including a smart rabbit-like robot called A.U Rabbit for families have also been released. There are A.U games in the Apple App Store and the A.U electronic devices. Brand awareness for A.U among primary school students had reached 63.3%.

Theme park
A theme park called A.U Cartoon Island (阿U国际卡通岛) in Xianghu Lake in Hangzhou was planned, and it would feature digital interactivity.

References

External links
4399 A.U page
66uu.com
66uu.cn
A.U Smart

2011 comics debuts
2012 Chinese television series debuts
Chinese children's animated television series
China Central Television original programming
Manhua titles